Tandernaken, al op den Rijn (also spelled: T'Andernaken, al op den Rijn) was once a very popular Middle Dutch song about two girls who in Andernach, a city in Germany on the left Rhine bank, were spied on by the lover of one of the girls, who was listening to their conversation on love affairs from a distance.

Middle Dutch text
The complete text of the song is preserved in the Antwerp songbook. Other versions are less complete.

History
The tune of the song survived in monophonic and in polyphonic sources, but the text of the secular song is only known through textual sources. Tandernaken was an international hit in the period between about 1430 and the 1540s as settings, preserved in Dutch, Italian, German and English sources, are listed by Franco-Flemish (or Dutch), German and English composers such as Jacob Obrecht, Antoine Brumel, King Henry VIII, Alexander Agricola, Paul Hofhaimer, Petrus Alamire, Ludwig Senfl and Erasmus Lapicida.

The earliest extant setting of the Tandernaken tune is by Tijling, a composer of whom, besides this composition, nothing else is known. His composition is included in one of the so-called Trent Codices (ca. 1433-1445). The tenor voice has the features of the polyphonic tenores of the Dutch and French song settings from the first half of the 15th century. These same features are found in a number of tunes which were notated with lines instead of notes on a stave (which is for instance the case in the Gruuthuse manuscript). These versions have all in common that the text has been noted separately from the tune or the tenor.

The earliest polyphonic settings of Tandernaken are registered in Dutch or Italian sources and were by Franco-Flemish or Dutch composers. The most recent sources and compositions are found in Germany. Probably, the tune became first popular in Italy before it entering Germany by way of Italian instrumental ensembles.

Most of the polyphonic settings do not give the text to the tune. Where there is a text, the text is a spiritual contrafactum. These 'monophonic' sources which do not provide any musical notation include also secular contrafacta. Although the text extant in the Antwerp songbook can be sung without too much difficulty by the tenor voice in the oldest settings such as these by Tijling and Obrecht, and although the tune of the extant non-polyphonic versions is related to but quite different from the tenor of the polyphonic versions, most of the polyphonic compositions can be regarded as instrumental settings.

An indication of the instruments with which the non-texted polyphonic versions of Tandernaken could be played, is provided by a manuscript made for the players of wind instruments at the court of Albert of Prussia, in which the word Krumbhörner, crumhorns, is mentioned in the bass voice. A setting by Hofhaimer was notated for three voices in tablature for organ. A si-placet-altus in mensural notation was added to the tablature of Hans Kotter, with the comment von einandern darzu zuschlagen, to be performed by another player separately. 
 
The first verse of Tandernaken is included in a Dutch quodlibet (for the text look for Quodlibet on the Dutch Wikipedia).

References

External links

Discography
Discography on the commercial web site amazon.com
Discographical search results on medieval.org for T’Andernaken

Audio Files
Ulanka sings Tandernaken on Youtube.com

Scores
Jacob Obrecht
Erasmus Lapicida
King Henry VIII
Alexander Agricola

Texts
Tune and two versions of the complete text of Tandernaken, as published by Florimond van Duyse. The first was taken from the Antwerp songbook and the second from a manuscript from the collection of the Library of the University of Amsterdam
Search results for Tandernaken on the web site liederenbank.nl

Dutch folk songs
Dutch-language songs
Songs about Germany
Middle Dutch literature
Renaissance chansons
Year of song unknown
Songwriter unknown